KUCR is a non-commercial radio station at the University of California, Riverside, in Riverside, California, United States, broadcasting on 88.3 FM. KUCR airs college radio programming similar to other college radio stations across the country. KUCR now includes in its program the rapidly expanding "Philosophy Talk" broadcast by Stanford University philosophy professors Ken Taylor and John Perry).

References

External links

KUCR's page on StylusCity

University of California, Riverside
Mass media in Riverside County, California
UCR
UCR